Souvankham Thammavongsa is a Laotian Canadian poet and short story writer. In 2019, she won an O. Henry Award for her short story, "Slingshot", which was published in Harper's Magazine, and in 2020 her short story collection How to Pronounce Knife won the Giller Prize.

Life
Thammavongsa was born in the Lao refugee camp in Nong Khai, Thailand in 1978. She and her parents were sponsored by a family in Canada when she was one year old. She was raised and educated in Toronto, Ontario. 

She has never taken an MFA course, and says that she has learned to write by reading. Some of her favorite authors are Alice Munro, Carson McCullers, Flannery O’Connor, and Tennessee Williams. 

Her first book, Small Arguments, won a ReLit Award in 2004. Her second book, Found, was made into a short film by Paramita Nath. Her third book, Light, won the Trillium Book Award for Poetry in 2014. Her short story "How to Pronounce Knife" was shortlisted for the 2015 Commonwealth Short Story Prize out of 4,000 entries. In 2016, two of her stories, "Mani Pedi" and "Paris," were longlisted for the Journey Prize.

Her first short story collection, How to Pronounce Knife, was published in 2020. Australian literary critic Kerryn Goldsworthy wrote of the stories that "their language is economical but they are emotional timebombs." In the book, she draws upon her childhood as the daughter of Laotian immigrants to tell fourteen stories, each an exploration of foreignness and belonging. The book was shortlisted for the Giller Prize, and won the award on November 9, 2020. In 2021, the book was awarded the $20,000 (Canadian) Trillium Book Award, and was a shortlisted finalist for the Danuta Gleed Literary Award in 2021.

Thammavongsa was a judge for the 2021 Griffin Poetry Prize. She was guest editor for 2021 Best Canadian Poetry (Biblioasis).

Works

Poetry collections
 Small Arguments (Pedlar Press, 2003)
 Found (Pedlar Press, 2007)
 Light (Pedlar Press, 2013)
 Cluster (McClelland & Stewart/Penguin Random House, 2019)

Short stories
 "Ewwrrrkk" (Joyland Magazine, 2015)
 "Mani Pedi" (The Puritan, 2015)
 How to Pronounce Knife.  (Granta, #141 special Canada, 2017, pp 168 – 173, with a photo of her and her family 1983)
 How to Pronounce Knife. Stories. Penguin (2020, 192 pp)
 "Good-Looking" (The New Yorker, 2021)

References

1978 births
Canadian women poets
21st-century Canadian poets
Canadian writers of Asian descent
Canadian people of Laotian descent
Living people
Writers from Toronto
21st-century Canadian women writers
Laotian women writers
21st-century Canadian short story writers
Canadian women short story writers
Laotian poets
Laotian short story writers
Laotian women poets